Anna Łukasik (born 27 July 1987 in Lublin, Poland) is a Polish dressage rider. She represented Poland at the 2014 World Equestrian Games in Normandy, France where she finished 17th in team dressage and 58th in the individual dressage competition.

References

External links
 

Living people
1987 births
Sportspeople from Lublin
Polish female equestrians
Polish dressage riders